Jessica Bennett is an American journalist and author who writes on gender issues, politics and culture. She was the first gender editor of The New York Times and is a former staff writer at Newsweek and columnist at Time. 

She is the author of Feminist Fight Club: A Survival Manual for a Sexist Workplace (HarperCollins, 2016) and This Is 18: Girls Lives Through Girls’ Eyes (Abrams, 2019). She is an adjunct professor at the Arthur L. Carter Graduate School of Journalism at New York University.

Personal background
Bennett grew up in Seattle, Washington, where she attended Garfield High School. She received a B.S. in journalism from Boston University, where she worked as a student reporter covering crime at The Boston Globe.

Career
Bennett moved to New York City to become a research assistant to the late Village Voice investigative reporter Wayne Barrett, longtime chronicler of corrupt city politics and politicians, including Rudy Giuliani and Donald Trump.

At Newsweek and Time 
She went on to become a staff writer at Newsweek, where she spent six years, and won a NY Press Club award for the story on the Nikki Catsouras photographs controversy about a family's struggle to remove their daughter's gruesome death photos from the internet. She also wrote on LGBTQ issues and social trends, earning a GLAAD Award. In 2010, she and two colleagues wrote a cover story titled "Are We There Yet?" about Newsweeks long history of sexism. It appeared on the 40th anniversary of a landmark lawsuit against the magazine, in which 46 female staffers sued the company for gender discrimination in 1970. That story became a book, The Good Girls Revolt, by Lynn Povich and an Amazon television series of the same name.

Bennett left Newsweek after it merged with The Daily Beast and worked briefly at Tumblr and Sheryl Sandberg's nonprofit Lean In, where she cofounded the Lean In Collection with Getty Images, a photo initiative to change the depiction of women in stock photography. She later became a columnist for Time, writing on women and culture.

At New York Times 
For The New York Times, Bennett has been a contributing writer and columnist for the Style section and is a contributing editor for the Opinion section. Previously, she served as the newspaper's gender editor, working to expand coverage of women and gender issues across platforms. In that role, Bennett created the In Her Words newsletter, launched the Overlooked obituaries project and published the perspectives of young women around the world through "This is 18", a photography initiative that became an international exhibit and book. She co-hosted The Timess annual women’s conference, The New Rules Summit and guided the newspaper's coverage of the centennial of the 19th amendment.

Subjects 
Bennett has written on the #MeToo movement, uncovered allegations of sexual misconduct against the playwright Israel Horovitz, and has covered cultural trends such as the attempt by Playboy magazine to rebrand, feminists joining sororities, the rise of sexual consent training programs on college campuses and the evolution of Miss America. Her profiles include Monica Lewinsky, Paula Broadwell, Ellen Pao, E. Jean Carroll, Jennifer Aniston and Katie Hill. She once wrote a viral piece about her Resting Bitch Face.

Books 
In 2016, Bennett published her first book, Feminist Fight Club: A Survival Manual for a Sexist Workplace, which was called "engaging, practical and hilarious" by Sheryl Sandberg and "a classic f--k you feminist battle guide" by Ilana Glazer.

She is editor of This Is 18: Girls Lives Through Girls’ Eyes (Abrams, 2019), an expansion of the New York Times project of the same name.

Awards and honors
Bennett has been honored by the Newswomen's Club of New York, GLAAD Media Award, the New York Press Club and the International Center of Photography.

References

External links 
 Jessica Bennett personal website
 Articles by Jessica Bennett for The New York Times
 Feminist Fight Club: An Office Survival Manual for a Sexist Workplace

1982 births
American women columnists
21st-century American women writers
Living people
American women journalists
American women bloggers
American bloggers
Boston University alumni
21st-century American non-fiction writers